This is a timeline documenting events of Jazz in the year 1984.

Events

April
 13 – The 11th Vossajazz started in Voss, Norway (April 13 – 15).

May
 23 – 12th Nattjazz started in Bergen, Norway (May 23 – June 6).

June
 8 – 13th Moers Festival started in Moers, Germany (June 8 – 11).
 29 – The 5th Montreal International Jazz Festival started in Montreal, Quebec, Canada (June 29 – July 8).

July
 5 – The 18th Montreux Jazz Festival started in Montreux, Switzerland (July 5 – 21).
 13 – The 9th North Sea Jazz Festival started in The Hague, Netherlands (July 13 – 15).

August
 17 – The very first Brecon Jazz Festival started in Brecon, Wales (April 17 – 19).

September
 14 – The 27th Monterey Jazz Festival started in Monterey, California (September 14 – 16).

Album releases

John Zorn: Locus Solus
Geri Allen: Printmakers
Steps Ahead: Modern Times
Oliver Lake: Expandable Language
Henry Threadgill: Subject To Change
Hal Russell: Conserving NRG
Microscopic Septet: Let's Flip
Joachim Kuhn: Distance
Henry Kaiser: Invite The Spirit
Mark Helias: Split Image
Hilton Ruiz: Crosscurrents
Paul Motian: The Story of Maryam
Keith Tippett: A Loose Kite In A Gentle Wind
Dave Holland: Seeds of Time
James Williams: Alter Ego
Andy Laverne: Liquid Silver
Bobby McFerrin: The Voice 
Chick Corea and Steve Kujala: Voyage
Chick Corea: Children's Songs
Herbie Hancock: Sound System
Wynton Marsalis: Hot House Flowers
Branford Marsalis: Scenes in the City
Sonny Rollins: Sunny Days, Starry Nights
Ron Carter and Jim Hall: Telephone
Weather Report: Domino Theory
Jane Ira Bloom and Fred Hersch: As One
Fred Hersch: Horizons
Bill Frisell: Rambler
Bill Frisell and Vernon Reid: Smash & Scatteration
Art Blakey and the Jazz Messengers: New York Scene
Benny Golson: Nostalgia
Art Farmer and Lionel Hampton: In Concert
Art Farmer and Slide Hampton: In Concert
Clare Fischer: Crazy Bird
Martial Solal: Plays Hodeir
Anthony Braxton: Prag (Quartet-1984)
Pat Metheny Group: First Circle
John Abercrombie: Night
Jack De Johnette: Album Album
Kenny Garrett: Introducing Kenny Garrett
Mal Waldron and David Friesen: Encounters
Lee Konitz: Wild at Springtime
Art Ensemble of Chicago: The Third Decade
Pat Metheny: Rejoicing
Kenny Wheeler: Double, Double You
George Duke: Rendezvous
Miles Davis: Decoy
Hugh Masekela: Techno-Bush

Deaths

 January
 10 – Thore Jederby, Swedish upright bassist, record producer, and radio broadcaster (born 1913).

 February
 19 – Claude Hopkins, American stride pianist and bandleader (born 1903).

 March
 7 – Ethel Azama, American singer (born 1934).

 April
 3 – John Mehegan, Kjeld Bonfils, American jazz pianist, lecturer, and critic (born 1916).
 13 – George Fierstone, English drummer (born 1916).
 20 – Mabel Mercer, English-born cabaret singer (born 1900).
 23
 Red Garland, American pianist, band leader, and composer (born 1923).
 Juan Tizol, Puerto Rican trombonist and composer (born 1900).
 26 – Count Basie, American pianist, organist band leader, and composer (born 1904).

 May
 18 – Ray Copeland, American trumpeter and teacher (born 1926).

 June
 22 – Red Garland (60), American pianist, band leader, and composer (born 1923).
 26 – Dill Jones, Welsh jazz stride pianist (born 1923).
 26 – Albert Dailey, American pianist (born 1939).

 July
 5 – Don Elliott, American trumpeter, vibraphonist, and vocalist (born 1926).
 14 – Bill Stapleton, American trumpeter and arranger (born 1945).
 24 – Frank Butler, American drummer (born 1928).

 August
 7 – Esther Phillips, American singer (born 1935).
 12 – Lenny Breau, American guitarist and music educator (born 1941).

 September
 10
 Herman Sherman, American saxophonist and bandleader (born 1923).
 Trummy Young, African-American trombonist (born 1912).
 26 – Shelly Manne, American drummer (born 1920).

 October
 13 – Kjeld Bonfils, Danish pianist and vibraphonist (born 1918).
 16 – Jiří Jelínek, Czech painter, illustrator, jazz trumpeter, and singer (born 1922).
 17 – Alberta Hunter, American singer and songwriter (born 1895).
 20 – Budd Johnson, American saxophonist and clarinetist (born 1910).
 Ronnie Ball, English pianist, composer, and arranger (born 1927).

 November
 16 – Vic Dickenson, American trombonist (born 1906).

 December
 8 – Gene Ramey, jazz musician (born 1913).
 15 – Eddie Beal, American pianist (born 1910).

 Unknown date
 Elmon Wright, American trumpeter (born 1929).

Births

 January
 4 – Trond Bersu, Norwegian drummer.
 5 – Shinya Fukumori, Japanese drummer and composer.
 19 – Yvonnick Prene, French harmonica player and composer.
 24 – Jason Nazary, American drummer.
 28 – David Helbock, Austrian pianist and composer

 February
 20 – Mari Kvien Brunvoll, Norwegian singer and composer.
 23 – Lucia Cadotsch, Swiss singer and composer.

 March
 4 – Sheila Permatasaka, Indonesian bassist.

 April
 4 – Steinar Aadnekvam, Norwegian jazz guitarist.
 26 – Andrea Rydin Berge, Norwegian singer and pianist.

 May
 16 – Zara McFarlane, Jamaican-British singer and songwriter.
 28 – Obenewa, English singer-songwriter and multi-instrumentalist.
 29 – Jo Berger Myhre, Norwegian upright bassist, Splashgirl.

 June
 18 – Frida Ånnevik, Norwegian singer.
 21 – David Lyttle, Northern Irish musician, songwriter, producer, composer, and record label owner.

July
 8 – Jo Skaansar, Norwegian upright bassist and composer.

 August
 10 – Cyrille Aimée, French singer.
 14 – Kristoffer Kompen, Norwegian trombonist and composer.
 18 – John Escreet, English pianist and composer.
 25 – Linda Oh, Australian bassist and composer.

 September
 16 – Katie Melua, Georgian-British singer, songwriter and musician.

 October
 17 – Anja Eline Skybakmoen, Norwegian singer and composer, Pitsj.
 18 – Esperanza Spalding, American singer and upright-bassist.
 24 – Fredrika Stahl, Swedish singer and songwriter.
 29 – Anthony Strong, English singer, pianist, and songwriter.

 November
 29 – Sitti Navarro, Filipino bossa nova singer.

 December
 27 – Jørgen Mathisen, Norwegian saxophonist and clarinetist.

See also

 1980s in jazz
 List of years in jazz
 1984 in music

References

External links 
 History Of Jazz Timeline: 1984 at All About Jazz

Jazz
Jazz by year